Luis Callejo Martínez (born 1 August 1970) is a Spanish actor.

Biography 
Luis Callejo Martínez was born in Segovia on 1 August 1970. He trained his acting chops at the local Municipal Theatre Workshop, later joining the Madrid's RESAD.

His performance in the 2005 film Princesses earned him a nomination to the Goya Award for Best New Actor.

In 2016, he won a Sant Jordi Awards for Tarde para la ira.

Selected filmography

References

External links 

1970 births
Living people
Spanish male film actors
21st-century Spanish male actors
Male actors from Castile and León
People from Segovia